A barbell is a piece of exercise equipment used in weight training, bodybuilding, weightlifting, powerlifting and strongman, consisting of a long bar, usually with weights attached at each end.

The central portion of the bar varies in diameter from 25 millimetres (0.98 in) to 50 millimetres (1.96 in) (e.g., Apollon's Axle), and is often engraved with a knurled crosshatch pattern to help lifters maintain a solid grip. Weight plates slide onto the outer portions of the bar to increase or decrease the desired total weight. Collars are used to prevent plates from moving outward unevenly so that the lifter does not experience uneven force. 

The barbell is the longer version of the dumbbell that is used for free weight training and competitive sports, such as powerlifting, Olympic weight lifting, and CrossFit. Many exercises can be done using the barbell, such as bicep curl, bench press, Olympic weightlifting, overhead press, deadlift, and squat. Many fitness categories use the barbell for different reasons. For example, powerlifters use the barbell to perform compound exercise movements.

Use in Olympic weightlifting

Men's bar

It is the standard used in competitive weightlifting where men and women compete at the highest level: the Commonwealth Games, Pan-American Games, World Championships, and the Olympics. Bars of this kind must have suitable "whip" (ability to store elastic energy) and sleeves which rotate smoothly, as well as the capacity to withstand dropped lifts from overhead.

Women's bar
A women's Olympic bar is similar to the men's bar, but is shorter and lighter—, and —with a smaller grip section diameter. Also in contrast to the men's bar, the women's bar does not sport a center knurl.

Bumper plates
Weight plates used in Olympic lifting, which are often termed "bumper" plates, are coated in solid rubber to make them safe to drop from above head height. General strength training or powerlifting plates are made from cast iron and are considerably cheaper.

Currently, the following colour code is required by International Weightlifting Federation:

 green bumper plates were only officially approved for use by IWF from 1976 to 1980, Montreal being the only Olympic venue where they were deployed.

These can be aluminium or plastic and may have rubber edges.

Powerlifting
As a general rule, powerlifting requires use of stiffer bars to better accommodate the heavier weights being used in the sport. The deadlift barbell is usually the longest, thinnest and the most flexible, thus allowing more weight to be lifted. Powerlifting barbells use simpler, more robust bushings because they do not need to rotate as fast as Olympic weightlifting barbells. Sometimes the sleeves of powerlifting bars are also extended. This closer spacing is used to check legal grip width in the bench press. Powerlifting utilizes the same bar for both male and female competitors.

Another visual difference from typical Olympic bar or International Paralympic Committee approved one is that the IPF bar's knurling shall not be covered by chrome. Stating that bar should weigh  with collars on, effectively permits use of  bars only, because   
same as IWF, IPF requires collars to weigh  each.

Additionally, differently coloured plates are or were used outside of IWF sanctioned competition, most prominently in powerlifting.

These include:

Powerlifting plates in contrast to Olympic lifting ones are usually thinner (to accommodate more plates on bar) and as they are not meant to be dropped, do not need to utilize additional coating.

 plates are fairly rare, typically only used in some of the powerlifting federations still using plate sets scaled in pounds, such as IPA, SPF and their affiliates.

Black  polyurethane coated plates were introduced by Eleiko in International Paralympic Committee sanctioned London 2012 Paralympic Games. Apart from them and  record discs, IPC approved set uses the same plates as the IWF one.

Technically,  and smaller plates can be of any colour in IPF approved sets, although only colours listed above were used for them by few certified manufacturers.

Non-competition equipment
Most "Olympic" bars one can see in commercial gyms, although superficially similar to real Olympic bars to the untrained eye, do not share International Weightlifting Federation or powerlifting essential characteristics. They are just generic strength training bars, with wide variations in markings, grip section diameter, and exact weight.

Weight plates used outside of competition need not conform to IWF or powerlifting specifications, and can be of any colour.

Collars
Standard collars can be of any material, usually metal, and they can weigh up to  each for both men and women.

Other types of Barbells

Berg Prototype "Olympic" revolving Barbell 
This barbell was produced by the company Berg in 1910, but designed by Veltum. This was a major turning point in Olympic lifting as the barbell was able to revolve easily during the lift. After the Olympic games in 1928 Amsterdam, the barbells began to become popularized and many companies started to copy the barbell. The Berg barbell and copies of it were spread through many gyms around the world mainly from the 1960s to the 1970s because of the rise of the new barbell.

"Standard" or "One Inch" Barbells
"Standard" or more commonly "One Inch" or "1 inch" barbells are characterised by a bar that is very approximately one inch (25.4mm) in diameter along the whole of its length, with a commensurate sized centre hole in the weight plate. 

Despite the "Standard" name they come in a wide range of sizes that can have little in common with one another, and usually range from 25mm (0.98in) to 29mm (1.14 in) in diameter in varying lengths and other dimensions.  In contrast with the rotating sleeves and uniform sizes of Olympic bars, which mount plates with a fixed size centre hole; the ends of standard bars do not rotate, and commonly mount plates with centre hole diameters of 27 millimetre (1.06 in) through to 31 millimetre (1.14 in).  This variation may prove very problematic if plates are mixed and matched. As plates with smaller holes may not fit the larger diameter "standard" bars. Gauging this by eye is very difficult, so taking the bar (or a micrometer gauge) to check that new plates will fit an existing bar is essential. Alternatively a larger hole plate may rattle or spin on the smaller diameter "standard" bars unless very securely collared. Small circular spring clamp collars are most often used to secure the weights though more permanent fixings are available. Other variations include spinlock end bars with screw on nut collars and many others. 

The bar itself can weigh anything from 4kg to 10kg

The main advantages of "Standard" or "One Inch" barbells and weight plates are that they are often easier to store and take up less room; the bars may come apart into two or three sections, weigh less, may also be convertible to dumbbells, and are usually much less expensive than Olympic weights for those on a budget. Weight plates come in cast iron, or coated cast iron, tri grip, or far thicker and cheaper vinyl filled with concrete.

Dumbbells
Some dumbbell sets come with an attaching bar to convert the pair to a single barbell.

EZ curl bars

Originally known as a Dymeck curling bar after its inventor Lewis G. Dymeck, the EZ ("easy") curl bar is a variant of the barbell that is often used for biceps curls, upright rows, and lying triceps extensions. The curved profile of the bar in the grip region allows the user's wrists and forearms to take a more neutral, less supinated position. This reduces the risk of repetitive stress injury in these exercises. However, when performing the biceps curl, using an EZ curl bar prevents full contraction of the biceps, which can only occur with the wrist fully supinated, and thus may prove a less effective exercise.

Fixed Barbells
Primarily found in gyms, these are usually fairly short bars with weights already attached and welded to the bar, and in some cases, a covering of plastic/rubber around the plates. A typical gym might carry a range of fixed barbells from 5 kilos (11 lb) to around 50 kilos (110 lb). They are handy as they take less space than full-length bars and are useful for many exercises where less weight is required. They can also provide an easier starting point for beginners before moving on to using the full olympic bars. In addition, they provide for speedy transitions between various weights if one is doing multiple weights in quick succession.

Thick-handled Barbells

These specialty items are designed to challenge the grip. They're used in strongman competitions for the deadlift and overhead presses, such as Apollon's Axle. Recently, even such exotic diameters as  have appeared.

Triceps bars
Similar in function to an EZ curl bar, the triceps bar consists of two parallel handles mounted in a cage.  It is used to perform triceps extensions and hammer curls.

Trap bar/hex bars

A hexagon-shaped bar in the middle of which the user stands and grasps the bar, via side handles, with a neutral grip. The use of trap bars places the center of gravity closer to the lifter. Trap bars are used primarily for performing deadlifts and shrugs.

Safety squat bars

A bar with a camber in the middle, two handles and padding. The safety squat bar may help to avoid causing or aggravating injury while squatting.

See also

 Kettlebell

References

Weight training equipment
Weightlifting